The 2013 Internazionali di Tennis Castel del Monte was a professional tennis tournament played on hard courts. It was the first edition of the tournament which was part of the 2013 ATP Challenger Tour. It took place in Andria, Italy between 18 and 24 November 2013.

Singles main-draw entrants

Seeds

 1 Rankings are as of November 11, 2013.

Other entrants
The following players received wildcards into the singles main draw:
  Alessandro Giannessi
  Matteo Donati
  Riccardo Ghedin
  Claudio Grassi

The following players entered as an alternate into the singles main draw:
  Alessandro Bega

The following players received entry from the qualifying draw:
  Alexander Ritschard
  Andriej Kapaś
  Louk Sorensen
  Elias Ymer

Champions

Singles

  Márton Fucsovics def.  Dustin Brown, 6–3, 6–4

Doubles

  Philipp Oswald /  Andreas Siljeström def.  Alessandro Motti /  Goran Tošić, 6–2, 6–3

External links
Official Website

Internazionali di Tennis Castel del Monte
Internazionali di Tennis Castel del Monte
2013 in Italian tennis